Caloptilia chrysitis is a moth of the family Gracillariidae. It is endemic to New Zealand. The larvae of this species mine and fold the leaves of species in the genera Weinmannia and  Elaeocarpus as well as Knightia excelsa, although only rarely for the later species.

References

External links
Image 

chrysitis
Moths of New Zealand
Moths described in 1875
Endemic fauna of New Zealand
Endemic moths of New Zealand